This article serves as an index – as complete as possible – of all the honorific orders or similar decorations awarded by Malacca, classified by Monarchies chapter and Republics chapter, and, under each chapter, recipients' countries and the detailed list of recipients.

Awards

Monarchies

Governors of Malacca 

 Syed Zahiruddin Syed Hassan ( 4th Yang di-Pertua Negeri of Malacca 25 May 1975 - 30 November 1984 ) 
  Founding Grand Master of the Premier and Exalted Order of Malacca (1978 - 30 November 1984)
  Founding Grand Master of the Exalted Order of Malacca (1978 - 30 November 1984)
 Mohd Khalil Yaakob ( 6th Yang di-Pertua Negeri of Malacca since 4 June 2004 ) 
  : Grand Master and Grand Commander of the Premier and Exalted Order of Malacca (DUNM) with title Datuk Seri Utama
  Grand Master of the Exalted Order of Malacca
 Zurina Binti Kassim, his wife 
  Grand Commander of the Premier and Exalted Order of Malacca (DUNM) with title Datuk Seri Utama

States of Malaysia

Governors of Sarawak 

 Abang Muhammad Salahuddin ( 3rd & 6th List of Yang di-Pertua Negeri of Sarawak 2 April 1977 – 2 April 1981 & since 22 February 2001 ) :
  Grand Commander of the Premier and Exalted Order of Malacca (DUNM) with title Datuk Seri Utama

To be completed if any new decorations for :

to be completed

Asian Monarchies 

To be completed if any ...

European Monarchies 

To be completed if any ...

Republic 

To be completed if any ...

See also 
 Mirror page : List of honours of the Governors of Malacca by country

References 

 
Malacca